Inauguration of James Madison may refer to:

First inauguration of James Madison, 1809
Second inauguration of James Madison, 1813

See also